Roseanna Bourke is a New Zealand academic and registered educational psychologist. As of 2019 she is a full professor at Massey University.

Academic career 

Bourke has a BEd (1988) from Massey University and a MEd (1991) from the University of Otago. She received a PhD (2001) from Massey University for her thesis titled Students' conceptions of learning and self-assessment in context. Bourke joined Massey University in 2006 and moved to Victoria University of Wellington in 2009. She returned to Massey in 2016, where she was appointed full professor with effect from 1 January 2019.

Selected works

Books

Articles

References

External links 

 
 

Living people
Year of birth missing (living people)
New Zealand women academics
University of Otago alumni
Massey University alumni
Academic staff of the Victoria University of Wellington
Academic staff of the Massey University